Mechanicsville is an unincorporated community in Loudoun County, Virginia, United States.

References

Unincorporated communities in Loudoun County, Virginia
Washington metropolitan area
Unincorporated communities in Virginia